The Plant Commission was a commission in the United Kingdom that examined electoral reform started by the Labour Party while in opposition. The Commission was headed by Professor Raymond Plant
and recommended a move to proportional representation as a method of electing British Members of Parliament. Plans for electoral reform were shelved by the incoming Labour government in 1997 when the party won a 179-seat majority under first past the post.

References
 

Electoral reform in the United Kingdom